Mburucuyá is a town in Corrientes Province, Argentina. It is the capital of Mburucuyá Department.

From 1912 until 1927 Mburucuyá had a railway station on the Ferrocarril Económico Correntino narrow gauge railway from Corrientes.

Fiesta del Chamamé

In the 2nd week of February the town hosts the "Festival Nacional de Chamamé tradicional" which is a celebration of the Chamamé folk genre.

See also
Mburucuyá National Park

External links

Populated places in Corrientes Province